Nataša Novotná (born 29 October 1977 Opava) is a Czech dancer, choreographer, lecturer, co-founder of 420PEOPLE and founder of Kylián fund in Prague.

Education
She graduated from Janáček Conservatory in Ostrava.

Professional career

Dancer and choreographer 
In 1997 she was engaged in the Dutch ensemble Nederlands Dans Theater 2 (NDT2) led by Jiří Kylián. Between 2000 and 2002 she danced in the Swedish Göteborgs Operan Ballet and since 2002 she has been a member of the Nederlands Dans Theater (NDT1).
She has collaborated with leading world choreographers, e.g. . J. Kylián, O. Naharin, W. Forsyth, M. Ek, Crystal Pite, Meryl Tancard and others.
Since 2007, she has been working independently, performing contemporary dance, collaborating as a dancer with leading world scenes and choreographers such as the Tero Saarinen Company in Finland, Copenhagen International Ballet, Korzo Theater, Station Zuid and C-scope in the Netherlands, as well with Roberto Bolle, the soloist of the Teatro alla Scala or with the London's Sadler's Wells and Sylvie Guillem.

420PEOPLE 

Together with her former NDT colleague Václav Kuneš and manager Ondřej Kotrč, in 2007 she founded a contemporary dance ensemble 420PEOPLE, and acted as executive director of the ensemble until 2016. The name of the ensemble evokes Czech origin –  420  is the telephone prefix for the Czech Republic.

The ensemble performs regularly both abroad (e.g. France, Spain, Germany, Mexico, Holland, Finland, Norway, Japan, Great Britain, etc.) and on the Czech stages (among others National Theater, National Moravian-Silesian Theatre).

The ensemble organizes the participation of prominent foreign artists at events in the Czech Republic – such as Ohad Naharin, Abou Lagraa, Jo Strǿmgren, Ann Van den Broek, Sidi Larbi Cherkaoui and others.

Kylián Fund in Prague 
After a decade of working for 420PEOPLE, she founded  Kylián Fund in Prague  in 2017.

Further activities 
She is involved in initiatives to support Czech contemporary dance  and is a board member of the Vision of Dance professional organization.

She teaches at dance conservatories, Academy of Performing Arts in Prague and in ensembles in the Czech Republic and abroad. She is a lecturer in the Dance Studio of the New Stage, which offers both contemporary and classical dance lessons. Since 2017 she has been certified teacher of the Gaga movement language, developed by world-renowned choreographer Ohad Naharin.

Selected awards 
 2003 nominated by Dutch critics for Best Dancer for interpretation of Pneuma choreography by J. Inger (Dance Europe)
 2004 nominated by Dutch critics for Best Dancer for the interpretation of W. Forsyth's Duo choreography (Dance Europe)
 2008 Thalia Award (for dance performance in Small Hour choreography)
 2009 Dancer of the Year (at the DANCE PRAGUE FESTIVAL)

Selected choreography 
 2007  Znaky o znacích (created for Janáček Conservatory in Ostrava)
 2010  Sacrebleu  (created for 420PEOPLE)
 2012  Pták Ohnivák  (created for ballet ND Brno)
 2012 Rezonance na pěší vzdálenost  project with Berg Orchestra
 2013  Škrtič  (created for National Moravian-Silesian Theatre in Ostrava)
 2017  Portrait Parlé  (created for 420PEOPLE)
 2017 Daniel Špinar, 420PEOPLE: Křehkosti, tvé jméno je žena , directed by Daniel Špinar, New Stage of the National Theatre in Prague
 2018  "Dream On" (created for Janáček Conservatory in Ostrava)

Filmography 
 2013 Hamletophelia (dance fashion film), dir. by Jakub Jahn
 2016 Personal Shopper (mystery film), role: Ghost, dir. by Olivier Assayas 
 2017  Closed   (dance film), directed by Stein-Roger Bull, Jo Strǿmgren

Gallery

References

Citations

Bibliography
 National Theater Newsletter, No. 5, January 2017, 134. season 2016–2017, Národní divadlo, Praha, 2017, p. 36
 National Theater Newsletter, No. 10, June 2017, 134. season 2016–2017, Národní divadlo, Praha, 2017, pp.  24–5, 32
 Redakce: Křehkosti, tvé jméno je žena, In.: National Theater Newsletter, No. 8, April 2017, 134. season 2016–2017, Národní divadlo, Praha, 2017, p. 36
 Kateřina Hanáčková: Ohad Naharin: decadance, In.: National Theater Newsletter, No. 8, April 2017, 134. season 2016–2017, Národní divadlo, Praha, 2017, p. 25

External links
420PEOPLE: http://www.420people.org/cz/lide/detail/2-natasa-novotna
Nataša Novotná in Czech National Theater Archive
 Národní divadlo–profil umělce: http://www.narodni-divadlo.cz/cs/umelec/natasa-novotna
National Moravian-Silesian Theatre: Nataša Novotná in Národní divadlo moravskoslezské
 CZECH RADIO-Vltava: https://vltava.rozhlas.cz/generace-70-tanecnice-natasa-novotna-5061951
 CZECH TV: http://www.ceskatelevize.cz/lide/natasa-novotna/
 Idnes.cz: Martin Jiroušek: Ostrava černá, děvucha věrná, směje se choreografka Nataša Novotná (in Czech) https://ostrava.idnes.cz/tanecnice-a-choreografka-natasa-novotna-f00-/ostrava-zpravy.aspx?c=A131120_2002391_ostrava-zpravy_mav 
 Ballet masterclass.com: https://web.archive.org/web/20171018160440/http://balletmasterclass.com/faculty-2017/natasa-novotna/
 Opera+: Lucie Kocourková: 10.výročí 420PEOPLE.Velký rozhovor s Natašou Novotnou a Václavem Kunešem. (in Czech)  https://operaplus.cz/10-vyroci-420people-velky-rozhovor-natasou-novotnou-vaclavem-kunesem/ 
 Taneční aktuality.cz: http://www.tanecniaktuality.cz/rozhovor-s-natasou-novotnou-o-naharinove-boleru-v-ostrave/

Living people
1977 births
Czech choreographers
Czech female dancers
Dance teachers
Modern dancers